Nguyễn Ngọc Anh (born October 26, 1981) is a Vietnamese former swimmer, who specialized in breaststroke events. Nguyen qualified only for the men's 200 m breaststroke at the 2000 Summer Olympics in Sydney, by receiving a Universality place from FINA, in an entry time of 2:23.75. He participated in heat one against two other swimmers Andrés Bicocca of Argentina and Leonard Ngoma of Zambia. He raced to a second seed by more than a full body length behind winner Bicocca in 2:29.54. Nguyen failed to advance into the semifinals, as he placed forty-fifth overall in the prelims.

References

External links
 

1981 births
Living people
Vietnamese male swimmers
Olympic swimmers of Vietnam
Swimmers at the 2000 Summer Olympics
Male breaststroke swimmers